Dukkan-e Daud (or David's Store), is a late Achaemenid rock site located in the vicinity of Sarpol-e Zahab, in Kermanshah Province, Iran. The site was discovered by Henri Rawlinson in 1836. It consists of a rock tomb dug several meters high in a rock face overhanging a relief called Kil-e Daud (or David's tomb).

The tomb 
The tomb consists of a cavity opened by a wide and deep anteroom bordered by a double frame. held by 2 cylindrical columns whose shape resembles those of the Pasargadae palaces. The capital and the bases of the columns alone remain, having the form of tables. Take a brief look at the roundabout where the barrels were located. Rectangular entrance to an arched room decorated on one side with 5 niches that may have been used for lamps, and on the other with a larger niche for the body.The design of this tomb is similar to the design of other stone tombs located in Sahna, Qiz Qapan and Fakrika.

The relief 
The relief shows a priest wearing a Bashlick (a tapered cap with a pointed point projected forward) and holding a Barsom (staff of power) or a bundle of sacred twigs in the left hand. His right hand is raised as a sign of Zoroastrian ritual.

The post-Achaemenid reliefs, also called late Achaemenids, correspond to rock panels whose execution date is controversial. They were originally attributed to the Medes by Roman Ghirshman because of their locations corresponding to 12the old Media or Median style of dress. These reliefs were most probably carved in the 4th and 3rd centuries BC at the end of the Achaemenid period, or at the beginning of the Seleucid or even Parthian era. The authority of the Seleucids was actually exercised rather in Syria, upper Mesopotamia, and Asia Minor. It only extended to the western part of Iran, to towns on the main roads. Several provinces and most of the countryside therefore escaped Greek power. The reliefs made at this time therefore kept an Achaemenid style, and contains no trace of Hellenistic influence. Their execution is technically crude, attesting to a "provincial" character which clearly differentiates them from the official royal Achaemenid art in effect from Darius I until the fall of the First Persian Empire.

Gallery

References

See also 
 Achaemenid Empire
 Persepolis
 Seleucid Empire
 Essaqwand Rock Tombs
 Ravansar
 Qir
 Hulwan

Cities in Iran
Archaeological sites in Iran
Ancient art